Eyes of Fate is a 1933 British sports fantasy film directed by Ivar Campbell and starring Allan Jeayes, Valerie Hobson and Terence De Marney. It is a quota quickie, made at Shepperton Studios. It is also known by the alternative title of All the Winners.

A bookmaker seems to have struck it lucky when he comes across a newspaper containing the next day's horse racing results, but the paper also contains some more unsettling news.

Cast
 Allan Jeayes as Knocker 
 Valerie Hobson as Rene
 Terence De Marney as Edgar
 Faith Bennett as Betty
 Nellie Bowman as Mrs. Knocker
 O. B. Clarence as Mr. Oliver
 Tony Halfpenny as George 
 Edwin Ellis as Jefferson 
 Edmund Cozens
 John Herring 
 David Niven as Man at Race Course
 Hugh Rene

References

Bibliography
Wood, Linda. British Films, 1927–1939. British Film Institute, 1986.

External links

1933 films
1930s fantasy films
1930s sports drama films
British horse racing films
British fantasy films
British sports drama films
Films set in England
Films shot at Shepperton Studios
Films directed by Ivar Campbell
British black-and-white films
1933 drama films
1930s English-language films
1930s British films